"Rainmaker" is a single by Danish singer-songwriter Emmelie de Forest. The song was released in Denmark on 21 February 2014. It is the official song for the Eurovision Song Contest 2014. The song was written by Emmelie de Forest, Jakob Schack Glæsner, Fredrik Sonefors. The song has peaked at number seven on the Danish Singles Chart, as well as becoming her second top 75 single on the UK Singles Chart.

Background
Talking about the song Emmelie said, "It is about a tribe joining together to call upon the rainmaker to make their land blossom again. But on a more general level the rainmaker can be anything or anyone – it is about coming together and helping each other out". She also talked about enjoying success after winning Eurovision last year, "I’ve been performing my music around Europe, released my debut album and written a lot of new songs – to be honest, I’m living my dream!"

Live performances
Emmelie sang the song live during the Maltese national final, the German national final, the Andra Chansen round of the Melodifestivalen in Lidköping and Dansk Melodi Grand Prix 2014.

On 10 May 2014 Emmelie performed the song with the 26 finalists live during the final of Eurovision Song Contest 2014, at the B&W Hallerne, in Copenhagen, Denmark.

Track listing

Weekly charts

Release history

See also
 Eurovision Song Contest 2014

References

2014 singles
English-language Danish songs
Eurovision Song Contest 2014
2014 songs
Universal Music Group singles
Number-one singles in Denmark
Songs written by Emmelie de Forest